Operation Freedom's Sentinel (OFS) was the official name used by the U.S. government for the mission succeeding Operation Enduring Freedom (OEF) in continuation of the War in Afghanistan as part of the larger Global War on Terrorism. Operation Freedom's Sentinel is part of the NATO-led Resolute Support Mission, which began on January 1, 2015. OFS had two components: counterterrorism and working with allies as part of Resolute Support.

There were 16,551 NATO and non-NATO troops in Afghanistan around February 2020. Around June 2020, that number dropped to 15,937. In February 2021, there were 9,592 NATO and non-NATO troops in Afghanistan.

The self-reported strength of the Afghan National Security Forces consisted of more than 300,000 personnel during 2020. These forces surrendered or fled to neighbouring countries during the August phase of the 2021 Taliban offensive, leaving nearly all of the country under Taliban control.

Operation Freedom Sentinel was expected to formally end on August 31, 2021, but was de-facto completed one day earlier on August 30, as the last remaining troops withdrew and was officially terminated by the DoD on October 1, 2021 as it officially initiated its successor, Operation Enduring Sentinel.

Objectives 
After thirteen years of Operation Enduring Freedom, the U.S. military and NATO allies shifted focus from major military operations to a smaller role of NATO-led training and assistance. While the bulk of the new mission was under the NATO-led Resolute Support Mission (RS), "a separate 'non-NATO' contingent of U.S. forces will participate in force protection, logistical support and counterterrorism activities."

An October 1, 2015, statement by Gen. John F. Campbell, commander, Resolute Support Mission, U.S. Forces-Afghanistan/ISAF, defined the U.S. military's objectives. "U.S. forces are now carrying out two well-defined missions: a Counter-Terrorism (CT) mission against the remnants of Al-Qaeda and the Resolute Support TAA mission in support of Afghan security forces. Our CT and TAA efforts are concurrent and complementary. While we continue to attack the remnants of Al-Qaeda, we are also building the ANDSF so that they can secure the Afghan people, win the peace, and contribute to stability throughout the region."

When OFS started U.S. troop levels in Afghanistan were at 9,800 troops. General Campbell requested an additional 1,000 troops while NATO troop levels were built up to a force of about 13,500. His request was granted. In 2019, U.S. troop levels were at 14,000 troops in combined support of NATO RS missions and OFS. By January 2021, the U.S. had reduced its force level to 2,500 troops. However, it was later revealed that U.S. has 1000 more troops, which include Special Operations forces, than it disclosed in Afghanistan.

Moreover, as of January 2021, there were still approximately 18,000 military contractors, of which a third were U.S. citizens, in Afghanistan President Biden stated on July 8, 2021, that the war in Afghanistan would officially conclude on August 31, 2021. American airstrikes on Taliban members were projected to continue, but ended with the fall of the Islamic Republic.

Congressional reports 
The Lead Inspector General for Overseas Contingency Operations (Lead IG) is responsible for submitting a quarterly report on OFS to Congress. The quarterly report describes activities in support of OFS, as well as the work of the Department of Defense, the Department of State, and the United States Agency for International Development to promote the U.S. Government's policy goals in Afghanistan,

Excerpts from the January 1, 2018 – March 30, 2018 report:

See also 
Operation Allies Refuge – part of the evacuation from Afghanistan

References 

Military operations of the War in Afghanistan (2001–2021) involving the United States
Foreign relations of Afghanistan